Khalid Darwish (born 17 October 1979) is an Emirati footballer. He currently plays for Emirates Club. He is known for his ball controlling skills and excellent passing. He is sometimes nicknamed "Khalidona" after the famous football legend Maradona. The nickname is also a result of being the shortest player in the UAE Football League.

Darwish has played in Al Wasl FC since his childhood, throughout the different age group teams. He was loaned to Al Shabab Club during the 2009 Winter Transfer Window, but was brought back to Al Wasl the following summer.

Darwish left Al wasl for Emirates Club on 17 September 2011.

References 

1979 births
Living people
Emirati footballers
Association football forwards
Sportspeople from Dubai
Al-Wasl F.C. players
Al Shabab Al Arabi Club Dubai players
Emirates Club players
2007 AFC Asian Cup players
UAE Pro League players
United Arab Emirates international footballers